The Ancient Olympic pentathlon was an athletic contest at the Ancient Olympic Games, and other Panhellenic Games of Ancient Greece. The name derives from Greek, combining the words pente (five) and athlon (competition). Five events were contested over one day, starting with the stadion (a short foot race), followed by the javelin throw, discus throw and long jump (the order of these three events is still unclear), and ending with wrestling. While pentathletes were considered to be inferior to the specialized athletes in a certain event, they were superior in overall development and were some of the most well balanced of all the athletes. Their training was often part of military service—each of the five events was thought to be useful in battle.

History
The event was first held at the 18th Ancient Olympiad around 708 BC, and changed format a number of times. By the 77th Ancient Olympiad, the pentathlon was generally ordered into three sections: the triagmos of the long jump, javelin throw, and discus throw, the stadion foot race, and wrestling as the final event. The first three events were generally not held as individual events, but rather as only part of pentathlon competitions.

The wide variety of skills needed to compete meant that pentathletes were held in high esteem as physical specimens: in Rhetoric, Aristotle remarked "a body capable of enduring all efforts, either of the racecourse or of bodily strength ... This is why the athletes in the pentathlon are most beautiful".

Every four years when Olympic games occurred, there was the "Olympic truce". This was an agreement that all the city states agreed on. At this time there was an organized truce between all the cities involved in the games. This was done to give families and people the safety needed to travel long distance to the games. This truce was known as "Ekecheiria".

Events

The long jump is perhaps the most unusual, compared to the modern athletics version. A long jumper used weights called halteres to propel himself farther out of standing, and his jump probably consisted of five separate leaps, more like the modern triple jump; otherwise, distances of known jumps (which are often as far as 50 feet) would seem to be impossible.

The javelin, like the discus, was thrown for length, but in addition there was a second section of it where they threw for accuracy. The javelin was a lighter, longer version of a war spear. The "ekebolon" was the event won by distance. The "stochastikon" was the event based on accuracy.

The javelin throw used a leather strap, called an amentum, rather than having the athlete grip the shaft of the javelin itself. Competitors in the javelin and discus throws were allowed five throws each, and only their longest throw would count. The long jump was also attempted five times. In the classical games, it was traditional for all of these events to be performed naked.

In the discus throw the athlete must throw a solid bronze disc. They usually weighed around nine pounds, although varied in size. They took the longest distance out of five throws.

The stadion was a sprint of approximately 200 yards (or about 180 metres), longer than the modern 100 metres sprint, but shorter than all other ancient running events.

Wrestling was the fifth and last event of the pentathlon. The victor had to wrestle his opponent to the ground. Unlike modern-day wrestling where the entire back must be grounded, any part of the back was sufficient.

Wrestling was held in a sand pit at the Olympic Games outside the Temple of Zeus, while the other events were all held in the stadion (or stadium) from which the name of the race was taken. The basic formats of wrestling and discus throwing were similar to their modern versions, though the discus throw was performed from a raised podium rather than on a level field.

Winner
It is uncertain how the winner was chosen. It was unlikely that a single competitor could triumph in all five of the events.  One possibility is that the final event, wrestling, was used to rank a number of contestants who had qualified in the other four events, so that the victor of wrestling would be deemed the pentathlon champion.

Further reading
Pentathlon (athletic contest). Encyclopædia Britannica. Retrieved on 2009-08-02.
Smith, William (1875). Pentathlon. A Dictionary of Greek and Roman Antiquities, John Murray, London. Retrieved on 2009-08-02.

References

Pentathlon
Multisports
Pentathlon
 Extinct sports